The fourteenth season of the Case Closed anime was directed by Masato Satō and produced by TMS Entertainment and Yomiuri Telecasting Corporation. The series is based on Gosho Aoyama's Case Closed manga series. In Japan, the series is titled  but was changed due to legal issues with the title Detective Conan. The episodes' plot follows Conan Edogawa's daily adventures, including an episode in where the Black Organization attempts to assassinate a political candidate.

The episodes use nine pieces of theme music: four opening themes and five ending themes. The first opening theme is "Start" by Rina Aiuchi until episode 393. The third opening theme is "Growing of My Heart" by Mai Kuraki until episode 424. The fourth ending theme is "Thank You for Everything" by Sayuri Iwata until episode 424.

The season initially ran from February 14, 2005 through January 16, 2006 on Nippon Television Network System in Japan. Episodes 388 to 426 were later collected into ten DVD compilations by Shogakukan. They were released between May 26, 2006 and October 27, 2006 in Japan.


Episode list

References
General

Specific

2005 Japanese television seasons
2006 Japanese television seasons
Season14